Photinia glomerata is a species in the family Rosaceae.

References

glomerata